The 2019 PDC Pro Tour was a series of non-televised darts tournaments organised by the Professional Darts Corporation (PDC). Players Championships and European Tour events are the events that make up the Pro Tour. There were 43 PDC ProTour events held, 30 Players Championships and 13 European Tour events.

There used to be UK Open qualifiers as part of this list, but they were abolished in September 2018 as the UK Open was made exclusive for the 128 Tour Card holders, 16 Challenge Tour qualifiers and 16 Riley's qualifiers.

This page also includes results from the PDC's affiliated tours including the Development and Challenge Tours and all the regional tours as well as the results from the World Championship regional qualifiers. There were 20 Challenge Tour events, 20 Development Tour events, 10 PDC Nordic & Baltic Events, 12 PDC Asia Events, 30 Dartplayers Australia ProTour events, 6 EuroAsian Darts Corporation ProTour Events and 10 Championship Darts Circuit ProTour events during the 2019 season.

The 2019 season in darts saw a major shift in the rules between players playing in the Professional Darts Corporation and the British Darts Organisation (BDO). For the first time since the split in darts, the BDO let players that play in their World Championships take part in the PDC's Qualifying School without withholding their money or banning them. With the change in rules, high profile players such as Glen Durrant, Scott Waites and Mark McGeeney committed themselves to the Qualifying School.

Prize money
The prize money for the European Tour events have increased for 2019.

This is how the prize money is divided:

PDC Tour Cards
128 players are granted Tour Cards, which enables them to participate in all Players Championships events, the UK Open and all the European Tour events.

Tour cards

The 2019 Tour Cards are awarded to:
 (64) The top 64 players from the PDC Order of Merit after the 2019 World Championship. 
 (27) 27 qualifiers from 2018 Q-School not ranked in the top 64 of the PDC Order of Merit following the World Championship.
 (2) Two highest qualifiers from 2017 Challenge Tour ( and ).
 (1) The highest qualifiers from 2017 Development Tour ( and ).
 Luke Humphries is also in the top 64 of the PDC Order of Merit, and therefore, one extra Tour Card will be awarded to a Q-School qualifier.
 (2) Two highest qualifiers from 2018 Challenge Tour ( and ).
 (2) Two highest qualifiers from 2018 Development Tour ( and ).
 (12) The 12 qualifiers from the 2019 Qualifying Schools.
Afterwards, the playing field will be complemented by the highest qualified players from the Q School Order of Merit until the maximum number of 128 Pro Tour Card players had been reached. In 2019, that means that a total of 18 players will qualify this way.

Q-School
The PDC Pro Tour Qualifying School (or Q-School) was split into a UK and European Q-School. Players that are not from Europe can choose which Q-School they want to compete in.

The UK Q-School took place at the Robin Park Arena in Wigan from 17–20 January.
The European Q-School took place at Halle 39 in Hildesheim from 3–6 January.
The following players won two-year tour cards on each of the days played:

An Order of Merit was also created for each Q School. For every win after the first full round (without byes) the players get awarded 1 point.

To complete the field of 128 Tour Card Holders, places will be allocated down the final Qualifying School Order of Merits in proportion to the number of entrants. The following players picked up Tour Cards as a result:

UK Q-School Order of Merit 
  
  
  
  
  
 
  
  
  
  
  

European Q-School Order of Merit

Players Championships
Thirty events took place in the Players Championship. This also saw the rules change to mimic the new final phase implemented in the European Tour in 2018, where all matches were best of 11 legs up until the quarter-final, but then became best of 13 legs for the semi-final and best of 15 legs for the final.

PDC European Tour
The PDC European Tour remained at 13 events, but included an event in the Czech Republic for the first time.

PDC Challenge Tour
The Challenge Tour remained at 20 events in 2019.

PDC Development Tour
The Development Tour remained at 20 events in 2019.

Professional Darts Corporation Nordic & Baltic
The Professional Darts Corporation Nordic & Baltic Tour hosted 10 events held over 5 weekends. The two leading players of the PDCNB Order of Merit took part in the 2020 PDC World Darts Championship. The leaders were Madars Razma and Darius Labanauskas, but as Labanauskas has qualified via the Pro Tour Order of Merit, the third placed player, Marko Kantele, also played at the World Championship.

Professional Darts Corporation Asia
The Professional Darts Corporation Asian Tour hosted 12 events held over 6 weekends. Lourence Ilagan, Seigo Asada, Paul Lim and Noel Malicdem were the four players to qualify for the 2020 PDC World Darts Championship, but since Asada then went onto qualify by winning the PDJ Championships, Yuki Yamada took the extra space.

Dartplayers Australia (DPA) Pro Tour
The leading player of the 30 tournaments on the 2019 DPA Tour series will play at the 2020 PDC World Darts Championship. That player was Damon Heta.

EuroAsian Darts Corporation (EADC) Pro Tour
The EuroAsian Darts Corporation hosted 6 events held over 2 weekends. The winner of the EADC Championship will play at the 2020 PDC World Darts Championship. Boris Koltsov took the title and the place at the World Championship.

Championship Darts Corporation (CDC) Pro Tour
The Championship Darts Corporation hosted 10 events held over 5 weekends. The top ranked players from Canada and the USA will play at the 2020 PDC World Darts Championship. The leading players are Matt Campbell and Darin Young.

World Championship International Qualifiers

References 

 
PDC Pro Tour
2019 in darts